Euxoa christophi is a moth of the family Noctuidae. It is found on the steppes of southern Russia, the European part of Kazakhstan, western Turkestan and southern Ferghana.

External links
lepiforum.de

Euxoa
Insects of Turkey
Moths described in 1870